The J/32 is an American sailboat, that was designed by Alan Johnstone and first built in 1996.

Production
The boat was built by Tillotson Pearson for J Boats in the United States, starting in 1996, with 85 examples completed. The design is now out of production.

Design

The J/32 is a small recreational keelboat, built predominantly of fiberglass. It has a fractional sloop rig, an internally-mounted spade-type rudder and a fixed fin keel with a weighted bulb.

The design displaces  and carries  of lead ballast.

Operational history
In a review for Sail Magazine Robby Robinson wrote, "I had the opportunity to spend four days sailing the boat, and what fun days they were. Although the J/32 might be considered stiff by some, I liked this characteristic, because it allows the boat to accelerate out of a tack efficiently. Part of the secret- the cockpit is efficient, and visibility from the helm is good even with the dodger up. The mainsheet tackle system is double-ended and easy to handle.".

In a Sailing Breezes review, Thom Burns, was emotive about the design and wrote, "you’re getting a modern interior and a state of the art cruising rig. You’re getting a boat you can be proud of for years to come. The ideal cruising boat for many years has been the classic 40 foot sloop. For many, this may no longer be true. When a 32 footer feels like a 40 footer you’re going to sail with a smile. Bring along a great conversationalist and a well stocked library, there’s not much to do!".

Practical Sailor published a review in 2000, that concluded, "we think Alan Johnstone hit the target he was aiming for. She’s a legitimate performance cruiser with spacious accommodations."

In a 2002 review Herb McCormick wrote for Cruising World, "as one who has often wandered the docks muttering that nothing new has occurred in the sailboat market in the last 20 years, I walked off the J/32 ready to eat my words, my hat, or whatever else was offered. Young couples or retired ones looking for a boat that’s a blast to sail and still full of creature comfort should put this one on their shopping lists."

See also
List of sailing boat types

Related development
J/22
J/24
J/27

Similar sailboats
Bayfield 30/32
B Boats B-32
Beneteau Oceanis 321
C&C 32
C&C 99
Catalina 320
Contest 32 CS
Douglas 32
Hunter 32 Vision
Hunter 326
Mirage 32
Nonsuch 324
Ontario 32
Ranger 32

References

External links

Keelboats
1990s sailboat type designs
Sailing yachts
Sailboat type designs by Alan Johnstone
Sailboat types built by J/Boats